A tetraquark, in particle physics, is an exotic meson composed of four valence quarks. A tetraquark state has long been suspected to be allowed by quantum chromodynamics, the modern theory of strong interactions.  A tetraquark state is an example of an exotic hadron which lies outside the conventional quark model classification. A number of different types of tetraquark have been observed.

History and discoveries

Several tetraquark candidates have been reported by particle physics experiments in the 21st century. The quark contents of these states are almost all qQ, where q represents a light (up, down or strange) quark, Q represents a heavy (charm or bottom) quark, and antiquarks are denoted with an overline. The existence and stability of tetraquark states with the qq (or QQ) have been discussed by theoretical physicists for a long time, however these are yet to be reported by experiments.

Timeline
In 2003, a particle temporarily called X(3872), by the Belle experiment in Japan, was proposed to be a tetraquark candidate, as originally theorized. The name X is a temporary name, indicating that there are still some questions about its properties to be tested.

In 2004, the DsJ(2632) state seen in Fermilab's SELEX was suggested as a possible tetraquark candidate.

In 2007, Belle announced the observation of the Z(4430) state, a  tetraquark candidate. There are also indications that the Y(4660), also discovered by Belle in 2007, could be a tetraquark state.

In 2009, Fermilab announced that they have discovered a particle temporarily called Y(4140), which may also be a tetraquark.

In 2010, two physicists from DESY and a physicist from Quaid-i-Azam University re-analyzed former experimental data and announced that, in connection with the (5S) meson (a form of bottomonium), a well-defined tetraquark resonance exists.

In June 2013, the BES III experiment in China and the Belle experiment in Japan independently reported on Zc(3900), the first confirmed four-quark state.

In 2014, the Large Hadron Collider experiment LHCb confirmed the existence of the Z(4430) state with a significance of over 13.9 σ.

In December 2017, DØ also reported observing the X(5568) using a different  final state.
However, it was not observed in searches by the LHCb, CMS, CDF, or ATLAS experiments.

In June 2016, LHCb announced the discovery of three additional tetraquark candidates, called X(4274), X(4500) and X(4700).

In 2020, LHCb announced the discovery of a

tetraquark: X(6900). In 2022, ATLAS observed X(6900). 

In 2021, LHCb announced the discovery of four additional tetraquarks, including cu.

In 2022, LHCb announced the discovery of cu and cd.

See also
 Color confinement 
 Hadron 
 Double-charm tetraquark
 Pentaquark
Tetraneutron

References

External links
The Belle experiment (press release)

Mesons
Hypothetical composite particles
Nuclear physics
Quantum chromodynamics